Saverdun (Languedocien: Savardun) is a commune in the Ariège department in southwestern France.

Population
Inhabitants of Saverdun are called Saverdunois in French.

Name
Saverdun gave its name to the former city of Verdun, Quebec, Canada, now a borough of Montreal, which was founded in 1671 by Zacharie Dupuy, a native of Saverdun.

History
Count Raymond VII of Toulouse surrendered Saverdun to Imbert de Beaujeu and Hugh of La Tour-du-Pin, royal agents, during the war of 1242.

Transport
Saverdun station has rail connections to Toulouse, Foix and Latour-de-Carol.

See also
Communes of the Ariège department

References

Communes of Ariège (department)
Ariège communes articles needing translation from French Wikipedia